The Sofia Valley, or Sofia Field, is a valley in central western Bulgaria bordering Stara Planina to the northeast, the Viskyar, Lyulin, Vitosha and Lozen mountains to the southwest, the Vakarel Mountain to the southeast and the low Slivnitsa Heights to the northwest.

After the valley's bottom was formed, the stream of the Iskar River was blocked and the whole valley became a lake, causing the gritty and clay-like soils that now cover most of the valley. The lake ceased to exist when the river drove through the Stara Planina, forming the Iskar Gorge.

The Sofia Valley is rich in mineral springs such as Gorna Banya, Pancharevo and Bankya, which are, together with the valley's predisposal to seismic activity, the result of its fault character.

References 

Valleys of Bulgaria
Landforms of Sofia City Province
Landforms of Sofia Province
Valleys of Europe